Gunnar Hagen (11 June 1904 – 6 April 1969) was a Norwegian athlete. He competed in the men's decathlon at the 1928 Summer Olympics.

References

External links
 

1904 births
1969 deaths
Athletes (track and field) at the 1928 Summer Olympics
Norwegian decathletes
Olympic athletes of Norway
Sportspeople from Møre og Romsdal